Mionga ki Ôbo (Theatrically: Mionga ki Ôbo: Mar e Selva), is a 2002 São Toméan documentary film directed by Ângelo Torres and co-produced by Luis Correia and Noé Mendelle for LX Filmes.

The film deals with the amazing journey of the oldest inhabitants of the island of São Tomé: The Angolares. They are reputedly descendants of Angolan slaves who survived a 1540 shipwreck. This is one of few films filmed and documented in São Tomé and Príncipe.

Cast
 Nezó as himself - Painter, Musician, Sculptor
 Vino Sr. as himself - Retired Fisherman
 João Sr. as himself - Retired Fisherman
 Baltazar Quaresma as himself - Student
 Julieta Paulina Lundi as himself - Fisherman
 Bibiano da Silva as himself - Fisherman who no longer fishes
 Fernando Sr. as himself - Merchant
 António Soares Pereira as himself - Fisherman
 Liga Liga as himself - Healer
 Dance Group of S. João dos Angolares as Themselves
 Voice of the King Group as Themselves
 Bulauê Group as Themselves
 Congo Dance Group as Themselves
 Anguené Group as Themselves

References

External links
 
 Mionga ki Ôbo in YouTube

2002 films
Films set in São Tomé and Príncipe
2002 documentary films
São Tomé and Príncipe films